Survival is the debut studio album by American rapper Dave East. It was released on November 8, 2019, through Def Jam Recordings, Mass Appeal Records, and From the Dirt. The album features guest appearances from Teyana Taylor, Rick Ross, Nas, E-40, The-Dream, Fabolous, Gunna, Jacquees, Lil Baby, and Ty Dolla Sign, among others. It was supported by one single: "Alone" featuring Jacquees.

Background 
In anticipation of the album, Dave East released a 5-part eponymous titled documentary showing the recording process of the album.

On November 27, 2018, Dave East announced his debut album's title and projected release date, however, it was ultimately delayed.

Commercial performance 
Survival debuted at number 11 on the US Billboard 200 chart, earning a total of 24,000 album-equivalent units in its first week of release. The album also debuted at number eight on the US Top R&B/Hip-Hop Albums chart, becoming his third top-ten album on this chart.

Track listing
Credits adapted from Tidal.

Notes
  signifies a co-producer
  signifies an additional producer
 "Everyday", and "Wanna Be a G" were originally from Dave East's Survival Pacc EP.
 "They Wanna Kill You" features additional vocals by Mike Kuz, Cousin Chet, Hood, and Melvin Brown
 "Penthouse" features additional vocals by Nipsey Hussle
 "Godfather 4" features background vocals by The Soul Rebels
 "Need a Sign" features additional vocals by Dave East's father David Brewster, Sr., and Cousin Chet, and background vocals by Desiigner
 "On My Way 2 School" features additional vocals by Jariuce Banks, Faye, and AJ and background vocals by Desiigner
 "Mama I Made It" features additional vocals by Faye
 "What's Goin On" features background vocals by Kali Pop, and additional vocals by Cousin Chet
 "Baby" features additional vocals by Marjorie Aristilde
 "What You Mad At" features additional vocals by Madd Rapper
 "Devil Eyes" features additional vocals by King Drew and Melvin Brown
 "Wanna Be A G" features background vocals by Bibi Bourelly
 "Daddy Knows" features additional vocals by Dave East's daughter Kairi Brewster
 "The Marathon Continues (Nipsey Tribute)" features additional vocals by Snoop Dogg

Sample credits

 "They Wanna Kill You" contains a sample of "Survival of the Fittest", written by Kejuan Muchita and Albert Johnson, and performed by Mobb Deep, and a sample of "The Rain, the Park, and Other Things" written by Steven Duboff and Arthur Kornfeld, and performed by The Cowsills.
 "Godfather 4" contains elements of "I Just Couldn't Take a Goodbye", written by Tom Brock, and performed by Gloria Scott.
 "Mama I Made It" contains a sample of "U Send Me Swingin'" written by Jeffrey Allen, Ricky Kinchen, Keirston Lewis, Homer O'Dell, Lawrence Waddell, and Stokely Williams, and performed by Mint Condition.
 "Baby" contains elements of "Just To Keep You Satisfied" written by Marvin Gaye, Anna Gaye, and Elgie Stover, and performed by Marvin Gaye.
 "Alone" contains an interpolation of "Feenin'", written by Donald DeGrate, Jr., and performed by Jodeci.

Personnel
Credits adapted from Tidal.

Performers
Dave East - primary artist
Nas - featured artist
Nipsey Hussle - posthumously featured artist
Teyana Taylor - featured artist
Jacquees - featured artist

Musicians
 Maki Athanasiou – electric guitar 
 Keyon Harrold – trumpet 
 Shaun Thomas – keyboards , guitar , bass guitar, organ, strings 
 Abraham Orellana – arranger, orchestrator 
 Timbaland – drums 
 Luca Starz – keyboards 
 Tim Friedrich – flute 
 Jordan Mosley – flute 
 Justin Mosley – flute 
 Dwayne Shippy – keyboard 

Technical
 Michael Kuzoian – recording , mixing 
 Garnett Flynn – recording 
 Dwayne "iLL Wayno" Shippy – recording 
 Mike Snell – recording 
 Todd Hurtt – recording 
 Najee "Sonny" Lane – recording 
 Mark "Exit" Goodchild – mixing 
 Chris Gehringer – mastering

Charts

References

2019 debut albums
Albums produced by AraabMuzik
Albums produced by DJ Green Lantern
Albums produced by Murda Beatz
Albums produced by Street Symphony
Albums produced by Swizz Beatz
Albums produced by Timbaland
Albums produced by Beat Butcha
Dave East albums
Def Jam Recordings albums
Mass Appeal Records albums